Djerfisherite is an alkali copper–iron sulfide mineral and a member of the djerfisherite group.

The chemical composition is somewhat variable. A Russian study from 1979 on djerfisherite from the Kola Peninsula found the formula , but a study in 2007 of a samples from Siberia found no detectable sodium and states that the formula  is considered the most appropriate. Both crystallographic studies have 58 atoms per unit cell. Sulfur atoms are in three nonequivalent locations, containing 12, 6, and 8 atoms per unit cell. The later study put a copper atom where the earlier study put a sodium atom. More information on the structure and other questions is available, as well as 3-D models.

Its type locality is the Kota-Kota meteorite (Marimba meteorite), Malawi. It was first described in 1966 and named after professor Daniel Jerome Fisher (1896–1988), University of Chicago.  It has been reported from meteorites, copper-nickel hydrothermal deposits, skarn, pegmatite, kimberlites and alkalic intrusive complexes. Associated minerals include kamacite, troilite, schreibersite, clinoenstatite, tridymite, cristobalite, daubreelite, graphite, roedderite, alabandite, talnakhite,
pentlandite, chalcopyrite, magnetite, valleriite, sphalerite and platinum minerals.

References 

Sulfide minerals
Cubic minerals
Minerals in space group 221